Cycloartane is a triterpene, also known as 4,4,14-trimethyl-9,19-cyclo-5alpha,9beta-cholestane. Its derivative cycloartenol is the starting point for the synthesis of almost all plant steroids.

See also
 Lanostane
 Cycloastragenol
 Cycloartenyl ferulate

References

Triterpenes